The 2012–13 season was Brechin City's seventh consecutive season in the Scottish Second Division, having been relegated from the Scottish First Division at the end of the 2005–06 season. Brechin also competed in the Challenge Cup, League Cup and the Scottish Cup.

Summary

Season
Brechin finished third in the Scottish Second Division, entering the play-offs losing 4–3 to Alloa Athletic on aggregate in the Semi-final and remained in the Scottish Second Division. They reached the first round of the Challenge Cup, the first round of the League Cup and the fourth round of the Scottish Cup.

Management
They began the season under the management of Jim Weir. On 29 September 2012, Weir was sacked by the club following poor results. Andy Millen and Kevin McGowne took over in caretaker capacities on 30 September 2012 following Weir's departure. The pair were in charge for the match against Arbroath the following week. On 9 October 2012, Ray McKinnon was appointed as the new manager, taking over with Brechin third from bottom.

Stadium
Due to drainage problems at Glebe Park causing a string of postponements and with available dates to play the postponed fixtures running out Brechin took the decision to play two home ties at Station Park. This was done in an effort to avoid further postponements.

Results & fixtures

Pre season

Scottish Second Division

First Division play-offs

Scottish Challenge Cup

Scottish League Cup

Scottish Cup

Player statistics

Squad 
Last updated 11 May 2013 

|}
a.  Includes other competitive competitions, including the play-offs and the Challenge Cup.

Disciplinary record
Includes all competitive matches.
Last updated 11 May 2013

Team statistics

League table

Division summary

Transfers

Players in

Players out

References

Brechin City F.C. seasons
Brechin City